Duyan (International title: Cradle of Love / ) is a 2006 Philippine television drama series broadcast by GMA Network. The series is the fifth installment of Now and Forever. Directed by Mac Alejandre, it stars Dawn Zulueta and Ariel Rivera. It premiered on April 17, 2006 replacing Tinig. The series concluded on July 21, 2006 with a total of 70 episodes. It was replaced by Linlang in its timeslot.

Cast and characters

Lead cast
 Dawn Zulueta as Adea
 Ariel Rivera as Mateo

Supporting cast
 Glydel Mercado as Loren
 Ella Guevara as Cindy
 Ella Cruz as Ella
 Emilio Garcia as Raul
 Alicia Alonzo as Precy
 Jana Roxas as Rowena
 Chuck Allie as Francis
 Gabby Eigenmann as Allan
 Ramil Rodriguez as Ronaldo

References

External links
 

2006 Philippine television series debuts
2006 Philippine television series endings
Filipino-language television shows
GMA Network drama series
Television shows set in the Philippines